The NATO N band is the designation given to the radio frequencies from 100 to 200 GHz (equivalent to wavelengths between 3 mm  and 1.5 mm) used by US armed forces and SACLANT in ITU Region 2.

The NATO N band is also a subset of the EHF band as defined by the ITU.

Particularities 
The NATO N band is not subject to the NATO Joint Civil/Military Frequency Agreement (NJFA). However, military requirement, which may apply to the NATO operations in ITU Region 1, are subject to coordination with the appropriate  frequency administration concerned.

References

Radio spectrum